Gyula Subert (better known as Július Schubert
or Giulio Schubert; 12 December 1922 – 4 May 1949) was a Slovak-Hungarian footballer who played as a midfielder. He played twice for the Czechoslovakia national football team and played club football for ŠK Slovan Bratislava and Torino. He died in the Superga air disaster.

Honours

Club
Torino
Serie A: 1948–49

References

1922 births
1949 deaths
Footballers from Budapest
Slovak people of Hungarian descent
Slovak footballers
Hungarian footballers
Czechoslovak footballers
ŠK Slovan Bratislava players
Serie A players
Czechoslovak expatriate footballers
Expatriate footballers in Italy
Czechoslovakia international footballers
Czechoslovak expatriate sportspeople in Italy
Association football forwards
Footballers killed in the Superga air disaster